Catriel Ignacio Sánchez (born 17 July 1998) is an Argentine professional footballer who plays as a striker for Instituto, on loan from Talleres de Córdoba.

Career
Sánchez is a product of Talleres de Córdoba youth sportive system and made his debut for this club in the Argentine Primera División in June 2017. In February 2018, was announced that he was close for signing of a contract with the Ukrainian Premier League club FC Karpaty Lviv. He signed contract with Ukrainian club on 1 March 2018.

References

External links

1995 births
Living people
Argentine footballers
Argentine expatriate footballers
Sportspeople from Córdoba Province, Argentina
Association football forwards
Talleres de Córdoba footballers
FC Karpaty Lviv players
Villa Dálmine footballers
Atenas de San Carlos players
Estudiantes de Buenos Aires footballers
Instituto footballers
Argentine Primera División players
Uruguayan Segunda División players
Primera Nacional players
Expatriate footballers in Ukraine
Expatriate footballers in Uruguay
Argentine expatriate sportspeople in Ukraine
Argentine expatriate sportspeople in Uruguay